Liolaemus qalaywa is a species of lizard in the family Iguanidae.  It is endemic to Peru.

References

qalaywa
Lizards of South America
Reptiles of Peru
Endemic fauna of Peru
Reptiles described in 2020
Taxa named by Cristian Simón Abdala